Davah Yataqi (also Romanized as Davah Yātāqī; also known as Kūrānlū and Davah Tāqī) is a village in Charuymaq-e Sharqi Rural District, Shadian District, Charuymaq County, East Azerbaijan Province, Iran. At the 2006 census, its population was 548, in 72 families.

References

Populated places in Charuymaq County